The Dulcinea Solar Plant is a photovoltaic power station in Cuenca, Spain. It is equipped with 82,896 Kyocera KC-200-GHT2 photovoltaic modules, 6,078 Kyocera KD-210-GHP2 modules, and 66,286 Suntech STP-210/18Ud modules. 6,600 strings of 24 photovoltaic panels linked in series 300 SMA SC100-Outdoor solar inverters. The estimated available radiation of 1,810 kWh/m2 per year is 1,497 peak sunlight hours.

See also 

 Photovoltaic power stations

References 

Photovoltaic power stations in Spain
Energy in Castilla–La Mancha